Tempio Pausania is a town of about 14,000 inhabitants in the Gallura region of northern Sardinia, Italy, in the province of Sassari.

History 
Cultural and delegated administrative centre of the Gallura sub-region, Tempio has an ancient history. Typical granite-stone architecture of the historical centre presents many similarities with southern Corsican towns.

In 2005-2016 it was the capital of the province of Olbia-Tempio together with Olbia.

Main sights 
 Historical centre of the town, built in grey granite blocks (mainly 18th century); particularly Corso Matteotti, via Roma (Carrera Longa, Lu Runzatu, Lu Pultali), Piazza d'Italia (Piazza di l'Ara), Parco delle Rimembranze, Fonte Nuova (Funtana Noa) and Parco di San Lorenzo, via Mannu (ex via dei Nobili or dei Cavalieri)
 Nuraghe Maiori (Naracu Maiori)
 Nuraghe Polcu (Naracu Polcu)
 Ruins of Palace of Giudice Nino Visconti di Gallura (1200)
 San Pietro (Santu Petru) Cathedral;
 Santa Croce Church;
 Oratorio del Rosario (13th–14th century);
 Palazzo Villamarina-Pes (17th century);
 Palazzo degli Scolopi, (17th century), actually Provincial offices;
 Purgatorio (Lu Pulgatoriu) Church (17th century)
 Fonti di Rinagghju

Transport 
Tempio Pausania has national roads with Sassari (SS 672), Olbia (SS127) and Palau (SS133). There is a railway station on the narrow gauge Sassari to Palau line, with occasional tourist train services run by Trenino Verde.

See also 

Diocese of Ampurias
 Francesco Menzio

References

Sources

Cities and towns in Sardinia
Spa towns in Italy